Mark Evans is a professional Rugby Union player who plays for Moseley Rugby Football Club. Currently Mark plays for Old Halesownians in National League 3. He has also represented the North Midlands, and in 2008 was selected for the England Counties squad to tour North America. When he is not playing he is a teacher at King Edwards Five Ways Secondary School.

External links
 Confirmation of playing status.
 Moseley squad

English rugby union players
Living people
Moseley Rugby Football Club players
Year of birth missing (living people)